Yéyamba Wandzé Mdrou Ndo?, is a 2000 Comorian comedy drama film directed by Arsin Soiby and produced as a HMZ Productions. The film is the first feature film of Comoros.

Cast
 Jacqueline Abdillah		
 Djimba		
 Abderemane Djimby		
 Zali Hamadi		
 Laher		
 Youssouf Msa		
 Roukia Saïd		
 Arsin Soiby

References

External links
 

2000 films
2000 drama films